The Genius is a Dutch television game show series based on the South Korean programme of the same name.

Cast
 
 Thomas Olde Heuvelt
 Nelke Mast
 
 Nouchka Fontijn
 Roxanne Kwant
 Feride Tosun
 
 
 Anna-Maja Kazarian

References

External links
 

The Genius (TV series)
2020s Dutch television series
2022 Dutch television series debuts
2022 Dutch television series endings
Dutch game shows
Dutch television series based on South Korean television series
Dutch-language television shows